The Dutch identity card is an official non-compulsory identity document issued to Dutch nationals in the European part of the Netherlands and certain diplomatic missions. It has similar dimensions and structure as those of a regular bank card.

Use
All Dutch citizens from the age of 14 are required to be able to show a valid identity document when the police or other enforcement officers ask for identification. The identity card is commonly used for this purpose, but other identity documents such as a passport or driving licence may be used instead.

The Dutch identity card is also a valid means of personal identification in a number of countries outside the Netherlands and may be used as a travel document in those countries in place of a Dutch passport.

Identity information
A Dutch identity card includes the following information about the holder and the document (with fields in Dutch and  English):
 Nationality (Nederlandse)
 Document number
 Full name, including surname and all given names
 Photograph (both printed and processed to watermark)
 Date of birth
 Place of birth
 Height 
 Sex
 Personal number
 Authority (the authority who issued the concerning identity card, commonly the mayor of the municipality of residence; for example "Burgemeester van Utrecht")
 Date of issue
 Date of expiry (normally 10 years after the date of issue for adults, 5 years for minors)
 Signature
 Machine Readable Zone at the backside starts with I<NLD

As of 26 August 2006, newly issued identity cards are provided with a chip containing the information mentioned. Since May 2016, the identity card does no longer contain the holder's fingerprints. The chip has been included due to European regulations.

Validity
The Dutch identity card is a valid travel document within all of Europe (except Belarus, Russia, Ukraine and United Kingdom) as well as Georgia, Montserrat (max. 14 days), Turkey and on organised tours to Tunisia. 

Validity in EU/EFTA states is based on membership of the European Union, while validity in Turkey is based on the "European Agreement on Regulations governing the Movement of Persons between Member States of the Council of Europe".

Since the document is defined within the Dutch Passport Law (Paspoortwet) as a "travel document of the European part of the Netherlands" rather than a "travel document of the Kingdom", this identity card is not issued or valid in the ABC islands or the SSS islands.

An identity card is normally valid for a period of 10 years for adults and 5 years for minors.

European identity card

Before the introduction of the Dutch identity card (1 October 2001) on creditcard-format, an ID2-format European identity card was issued. This card was machine-readable as well and was valid for the same group of countries (but not for 11 out of 12 EU countries which acceded in 2004 and 2007). The card contained also information on the bearer's address and had fields in English, Dutch and French. After introduction of the Dutch identity card, existing European identity cards remained valid until expiry.

See also
 National identity cards in the European Economic Area
 Identity document
 Identity card BES
 Dutch passport

References

 Official copyright-free images of 2014 model Dutch travel documents

Netherlands
Government of the Netherlands